Surita Bhatia is an American chemist who is Professor and Vice Provost of Faculty Affairs at Stony Brook University. Her work considers the structure of soft materials, including polymeric hydrogels and colloidal glasses. She was elected Fellow of the American Institute of Chemical Engineers, the American Institute for Medical and Biological Engineering and the Society of Rheology in 2020.

Early life and education 
Bhatia was an undergraduate studied at the University of Delaware. She majored in chemical engineering, and graduated in 1995. She moved to Princeton University for her graduate studies, where she worked with William B. Russel on the rheology of associative polymers. Bhatia completed her doctoral studies in 2000, and moved to the French National Centre for Scientific Research (CNRS) Complex Fluids Laboratory as a postdoctoral researcher.

Research and career 
Bhatia joined the faculty at the University of Massachusetts Amherst in 2001, where she was awarded an National Science Foundation CAREER Award to study soft attractive gels.

At UMass, Bhatia developed engineering education programme that taught about equity, diversity and the societal impacts of engineering. Her teaching materials were selected by the National Academy of Engineering as an example of best practise in education. She has led programs to support underrepresented students in the biomedical sciences.

In 2012, Bhatia joined the Department of Chemistry at Stony Brook University, where she was promoted to Professor in 2015. She holds a joint role as a Staff Scientist at the Center for Functional Nanomaterials at the Brookhaven National Laboratory.

Bhatia has worked to elucidate structure-properties relationships of complex fluids using ultra small-angle X-ray scattering and ultra small-angle neutron scattering. She combines these techniques with rheology  to establish the molecular mechanisms that underpin dynamically arrested states and re-entrant behavior in colloidal systems.

Awards and honors 
 2012 AIChE Women in Chemical Engineering Mentorship Excellence Award
 2018 AIChE Award for Outstanding Contributions to Chemical Engineering
 2020 Elected Fellow of the American Institute of Chemical Engineers
 2020 Elected Fellow of the American Institute for Medical and Biological Engineering
 2020 Elected Fellow of Society of Rheology

Selected publications

References 

Living people
Year of birth missing (living people)
American chemists
University of Delaware alumni
Princeton University alumni
University of Massachusetts Amherst faculty
Stony Brook University faculty
American women academics
21st-century American women